Five Colleges may refer to:

Five College Consortium in Massachusetts
Five Colleges of Ohio
 The Claremont Colleges in Claremont, California.